A120, A.120 or A-120 may refer to:
 A120 road (England), a road connecting Puckeridge and Harwich
 A120 road (Malaysia), a road in Perak
 Ansaldo A.120, a 1925 Italian reconnaissance aircraft
 HMAS Launceston (J179/B246/A120), a 1941 Royal Australian Navy Bathurst class corvette

 One A120, a 4 GB of flash memory, webcam and Windows XP netbook computer

 A-120, an entity from the Roblox game DOORS inside ROOMS